The Dalit Indian Chamber of Commerce and Industry (DICCI) is an Indian association that promotes business enterprises for Dalits.
It was founded in 2005 by Milind Kamble. Some of the key members of DICCI are Kalpana Saroj, Chandra Bhan Prasad and Rajesh Saraiya.

Organization
DICCI has 29 state chapters and 7 international chapters. Members of DICCI come from diverse range of manufacturing, services and construction sectors. It organizes trade fairs and training camps among other things, and carries out promotional activities for the Dalit MSMEs. The organization is headquartered in Pune.

Activities
 In 2013, DICCI announced to float  venture capital fund to promote SC/ST entrepreneurs. SIDBI became first investor in the fund by announcing Rs 10 crore.
 In February 2015, Telangana CM Kalvakuntla Chandrashekar Rao announced one acre of land in Hyderabad and  financial assistance for setting up of a Dalit entrepreneur incubation centre.

See also 
Dalit businesses

References

External links

 

Chambers of commerce in India
Dalit